The Port of Klaipėda is a seaport located in Klaipėda, Lithuania. It is one of the few ice-free ports in northernmost Europe, and the second largest European Union port by tonnage in the Baltic. It serves as a port of call for cruise ships as well as freight transport. Regular passenger ferry lines connect to Kiel, Karlshamn, Copenhagen and other European cities.

History

The city of Klaipėda has been involved in maritime trade as early as the 13th century, and probably during prehistoric times, since it is located on the Amber Road. For several centuries its administration and its merchants defended the port and competed with the Port of Danzig and the Port of Königsberg. It was heavily fortified. At the beginning of the 20th century the port was transferred to the jurisdiction of the Ministry of Transport of the Republic of Lithuania. Before World War I, the major cargo was timber. During the 20th century, mineral and cellulose enterprises were established in Lithuania, and became port commodities. Infrastructure supporting the fishing and shipbuilding industries were also built.

Current operations

In 1991, after Lithuanian independence was declared, the Klaipėda State Seaport Authority was founded. It administers the port and supports its integration into the larger scheme of Lithuanian transport. The Port Authority is responsible for the maintenance, reconstruction and modernisation of the port infrastructure, while loading and unloading operations are managed by separate independent terminals. The port's land and infrastructure belong to the state, but some privatisization is underway.

The Port of Klaipėda is the most northerly ice-free port in the Eastern part of the Baltic Sea. The port can accommodate ships of up to 250 meters in length with draughts of up to 13.5 meters. The port is served by two railway stations and a highways which together link Klaipėda to Kaunas, Vilnius and cities in the nearby countries, such as Minsk, Kyiv and Moscow.

In 1997, 16.13 million tons of cargo were handled at the port, increasing to over 31 million tons in 2010. About 321,000 international passengers transhipped the port of Klaipėda in 2010, on ferries servicing Kiel and Mukran in Germany, Åhus in Sweden, and Copenhagen and Fredericia in Denmark.

In 2015, the Port Authority hired Austrian company Strabag for dredging the shipping channel to the depth of 15 metres.

Some of the major companies or objects operating in the port:
 Baltija Shipbuilding Yard
 DFDS Seaways
 Limarko laivininkystės kompanija
 Klaipėda LNG FSRU
 
 Klaipėdos Smeltė AB
 Klaipėdos Nafta
 Vakarų laivų gamykla

See also
 History of Klaipėda
 Ports of the Baltic Sea

References

External links 

 The Port of Klaipėda official website
 About the Port of Klaipėda
 Ferry from Germany to Klaipeda - DFDS Seaways (Germany)

Ports and harbours of Lithuania
Transport in Klaipėda
Klaipeda